Roger Roberto dos Santos (born 30 March 1986), known as Roger Gaúcho, is a Brazilian soccer player that acts attacking midfielder. who plays for ASA.

Career

Internacional
Roger made his Campeonato Brasileiro debut for Internacional in a 1-1 draw with Atlético Mineiro on 30 June 2007.

Energy Sports
In August 2008 his contract was terminated and he left for Porto Alegre in September in short term deal, for 2008 Copa FGF. In December 2008 he signed a 5-year contract with Brasa Futebol Clube, a proxy for football agent Energy Sports (as well as act as an investor). He let for Mirassol, a partner of Energy Sports in temporary deal immediately.

São Caetano
In April 2009 he left for São Caetano in 1-year loan. In December 2009 São Caetano signed Roger in 3-year contract.

On 20 May 2011, Roger joined Santos FC in 3-month deal In June 2011 he added 1 more year to the contract with São Caetano. In 2012, he spent his career with Oeste and Grêmio Barueri.

In 2013, he was loaned to Mogi Mirim, the new partner of Energy Sports.

Ponte Preta
In May 2013 he was signed by Ponte Preta. 50% economic rights of Roger still retained by Energy Sports and other investors.

Albirex Niigata
On 29 July 2013, it was announced Roger had signed a new deal with J1 League team Albirex Niigata.

Bucheon FC 1995 
On 28 December 2016, South Korean club Bucheon FC 1995 announced that Roger signed a new contract with them.

On 22 February 2017, Roger Gaúcho's contract officially terminated by mutual consent before the season opening.

Honours
Internacional
Campeonato Gaúcho: 2008

References

External links

1986 births
Living people
Brazilian footballers
Association football midfielders
Campeonato Brasileiro Série A players
Campeonato Brasileiro Série B players
Campeonato Brasileiro Série C players
Campeonato Brasileiro Série D players
Sport Club Internacional players
Clube Náutico Capibaribe players
Porto Alegre Futebol Clube players
Mirassol Futebol Clube players
Associação Desportiva São Caetano players
Oeste Futebol Clube players
Santos FC players
Grêmio Barueri Futebol players
Mogi Mirim Esporte Clube players
Associação Atlética Ponte Preta players
Criciúma Esporte Clube players
Ceará Sporting Club players
Campinense Clube players
Clube de Regatas Brasil players
Treze Futebol Clube players
Botafogo Futebol Clube (PB) players
Associação Atlética de Altos players
Clube Esportivo Aimoré players
América Futebol Clube (RN) players
Associação Portuguesa de Desportos players
J1 League players
Albirex Niigata players
Bucheon FC 1995 players
Brazilian expatriate footballers
Brazilian expatriate sportspeople in Japan
Brazilian expatriate sportspeople in South Korea
Expatriate footballers in Japan
Expatriate footballers in South Korea